Ronieli Gomes dos Santos (born April 25, 1991), better known as Roni is a Brazilian professional footballer who plays as a striker for URT.

Career
19-year-old Ronieli was a surprise inclusion in São Paulo's 2008 Libertadores Cup campaign where he was given the number 16 shirt.

He has been widely tipped to be as great as some of the biggest strikers to emerge from Brazil including Ronaldo and Pelé and he has been likened to AC Milan striker Alexandre Pato. Surprisingly he was loaned by Turkish 1st division team Karşıyaka S.K. for the season 2010–2011.

After a loan spell in Turkey, on 26 July 2011, he joined South Korean K-League outfit Gyeongnam FC on a season-long loan deal.

Roni has a contract with São Paulo FC until 31 December 2015.

Club statistics

Title 
São Paulo
 Brazilian League: 2008

References

External links 

 
 

Further reading
 Um sonho americano  by Rafael Reis (2008-03-03)

Living people
1991 births
Brazilian footballers
Brazilian expatriate footballers
São Paulo FC players
Karşıyaka S.K. footballers
Gyeongnam FC players
Sagan Tosu players
Associação Chapecoense de Futebol players
Esporte Clube XV de Novembro (Piracicaba) players
Clube Atlético Bragantino players
Adanaspor footballers
Mogi Mirim Esporte Clube players
Villa Nova Atlético Clube players
Luverdense Esporte Clube players
Esporte Clube Água Santa players
Clube Náutico Marcílio Dias players
União Recreativa dos Trabalhadores players
K League 1 players
J1 League players
Campeonato Brasileiro Série A players
Campeonato Brasileiro Série B players
Campeonato Brasileiro Série C players
TFF First League players
Expatriate footballers in Turkey
Expatriate footballers in South Korea
Expatriate footballers in Japan
Brazilian expatriate sportspeople in Turkey
Brazilian expatriate sportspeople in South Korea
Brazilian expatriate sportspeople in Japan
Association football forwards
Footballers from São Paulo